The 1916 Ohio State Buckeyes football was an American football team that represented Ohio State University as a member of the Western Conference and the Ohio Athletic Conference (OAC) during the 1916 college football season. In their fourth year under head coach John Wilce, the Buckeyes compiled a perfect 7–0 record and outscored opponents 258 to 29. Ohio State was 4–0 Western Conference opponents, winning the conference championship, the first in school history.

The 128 points scored against Oberlin remains a single-game Ohio State record.

Halfback Chic Harley was a consensus first-team pick on the 1916 All-America college football team. Other notable players included end Charles Bolen, center Ferdinand Holtkamp, and tackle Bob Karch.

Schedule

References

Ohio State
Ohio State Buckeyes football seasons
Big Ten Conference football champion seasons
College football undefeated seasons
Ohio State Buckeyes football